Tom Chris Korologos (born April 6, 1933) is an American former diplomat who served as the United States Ambassador to Belgium.

Early life, education, and early career
A second generation Greek American, Korologos was born in Salt Lake City, Utah. He has family origins from Tyros, Arcadia, in Greece. His parents, Chris T. Korologos and Irene M. Kolendrianos, are both immigrants from Arcadia, which is located in the Peloponnese region. His father was a bartender in Utah.

Korologos started out as a journalist with The Salt Lake Tribune.  Later he worked for the New York Herald Tribune, the Long Island Press, and the Associated Press. He was a U.S. Air Force officer from 1956 to 1957. He earned his B.A. degree at the University of Utah in 1956, and a M.S. degree from the Columbia University Graduate School of Journalism in 1958 where he received the Grantland Rice Fellowship and a Pulitzer Traveling Fellowship.

Political career
From 1962 to 1971 he worked for U.S. Senator Wallace F. Bennett of Utah. He served in the Richard Nixon and Gerald Ford presidential administrations from 1971 to 1975, and has worked closely with Presidents Ronald Reagan, George H. W. Bush, and George W. Bush. He was co-founder of Timmon's & Company, a Washington, DC consulting firm.  He has been involved in more than 300 U.S. Senate confirmations including assisting Vice President Nelson Rockefeller, Vice President Gerald Ford, Supreme Court Justices: William Rehnquist, Antonin Scalia, and nominee Robert Bork, as well as several cabinet secretaries, including: Henry Kissinger, Alexander Haig, and Donald Rumsfeld.

Korologos has had a wide and varied Washington, D.C. experience. He has served as a senior staff member in the U.S. Congress, as an assistant to two Presidents in the White House, was a prominent businessman, and most recently was a senior counselor with the Coalition Provisional Authority (CPA) in Baghdad. In addition, he was a long-time member of the U.S. Advisory Commission on Public Diplomacy and a charter member of the Broadcasting Board of Governors that has jurisdiction over all non-military U.S. Government radio and TV broadcasting overseas.  He currently is strategic advisor at DLA Piper in Washington, D.C.

Nonprofit board memberships
The Choral Arts Society of Washington
Meridian International Center
The National Security Agency advisory board
The Aspen Institute/Rockefeller Foundation Commission on Reform of the Appointment Process
Layalina Broadcasting

Personal life
Korologos was married to Joy G. Korologos, who died from melanoma in 1997. The couple had three children, Paula, Ann, and Philip. Paula, one of their daughters, is an actress who goes professionally by Paula Cale. Korologos remarried to art collector Ann McLaughlin Korologos (1941-2023), who was United States Secretary of Labor in the Ronald Reagan administration and who served on the boards of several major companies. Korologos is a professional photographer who showcases at the Ann Korologos Gallery, which was owned by his late wife, in Basalt, Colorado.

See also
 United States Ambassador to Belgium
 Foreign relations of Belgium

References

External links
 U.S State Department Profile

Korologos Family History
The Salt Lake Tribune -- Korologos Confirmation Hearing
Official Korologos Family Site
Richard M. Nixon Presidential Library and Museum Bio of Tom C. Korologos
Council of American Ambassadors

1933 births
Ambassadors of the United States to Belgium
American male journalists
American people of Greek descent
Columbia University Graduate School of Journalism alumni
Living people
The Salt Lake Tribune people
United States Air Force officers
University of Utah alumni
Writers from Salt Lake City